China's Next Top Model is a Chinese reality TV series, based on the international version and spin-off to the original, America's Next Top Model created by Tyra Banks.

The show was first produced by Chinese television subscription channel Sichuan Satellite TV and was filmed in Shanghai. The castings were held in selected cities of China — Shanghai, Beijing, Chengdu, and Guangzhou. It began airing on January 13, 2008. The first three seasons under Sichuan TV were presented by Chinese supermodel Li Ai.

After a three-year break, the show saw a fourth season premiering on the Chinese Travel Channel, which was hosted by Shang Wenjie. The producers of the show failed to secure the rights for a fifth season on the Travel Channel, and the show was renamed I Supermodel to avoid licensing issues. The official version of the show was renewed once again on a separate channel, Chongqing TV, in 2015. It was the first season of the show to feature male contestants within the cast.

Cycles

See also
I Supermodel
Asia's Next Top Model

References

External links
Official site
Article on China's Next Top Model

 
Chinese reality television series
2008 Chinese television series debuts
Mandarin-language television shows
Chinese television series based on American television series